The Convention on the Law Applicable to Products Liability is a convention concluded in 1971 within the framework of the Hague Conference on Private International Law (HCCH), which governs the law that should be applied to products liability cases. It entered into force in 1973 and as of 2020, 11 countries are party to it.

Scope of application
The convention exclusively determines the law that applies between the manufacturer or distributor of a product and the person(s) that have suffered damage. It thus does not handle which court has jurisdiction, or whether a judicial decision should be recognized. 

The convention does not apply between the seller that directly sold the product to the person suffering the damage. The exclusion was chosen as the negotiators deemed the relationship between those two parties already clear enough, and would hamper wide adoption of the convention. 

The products the convention applies to "shall include natural and industrial products, whether raw or manufactured and whether movable or immovable", and thus has a wide meaning. Member states can decide to exclude agricultural products from the scope of the convention (Article 16), as Spain did.

Applicable law
The convention's main articles determining which law should be applied are Articles 4 and (if that doesn't result in an applicable law) Article 5. They are summarized below:

Parties

References

Treaties concluded in 1973
Treaties entered into force in 1977
Products liability
Treaties of Croatia
Treaties of Finland
Treaties of France
Treaties of Luxembourg
Treaties of Montenegro
Treaties of the Netherlands
Treaties of Norway
Treaties of North Macedonia
Treaties of Serbia
Treaties of Slovenia
Treaties of Spain
Treaties of Yugoslavia
Treaties extended to Aruba
Treaties extended to Curaçao
Treaties extended to Sint Maarten
Treaties extended to the Caribbean Netherlands